Tambov is an air base in Russia located 4 km southwest of Tambov. It is a bomber training base with many Tupolev Tu-134UBL aircraft. 

The base is home to the 27th Composite Aviation Regiment with the Antonov An-12 (NATO: Cub), Antonov An-26 (NATO: Curl) & Tupolev Tu-134UBL(UBSh) (NATO: Crusty) which is part of the 43rd Guards Oryol Center for Combat Employment and Retraining of Long-Range Aviation Flight Personnel.

Yefim Gordon's MiG-23/27 book refers to a 652 UAP (652nd Aviation Training Regiment) stationed at Tambov/Vostochnyy flying 96 Aero L-29 Delfín (NATO: Maya).

Tambov used to be home to 4255 BRS flying Mikoyan-Gurevich MiG-23 (NATO: Flogger) aircraft.

References

External links

http://www.ww2.dk/new/air%20force/division/schools/tvvaul.htm

Soviet Air Force bases
Russian Air Force bases